Tritonis is a 1980 album by the Dave Brubeck Quartet.

Track listing
"Brother, Can You Spare a Dime?" (Music: Jay Gorney/Lyrics: Edgar Yipsel "Yip" Harburg - Arr: Dave Brubeck) – 7:08
"Like Someone in Love" (Music: Edward Chester "Jimmy Van Heusen" Babcock/Lyrics: John "Johnny" Burke)  – 5:39
"Theme for June" (Howard Brubeck) – 7:27
"Lord, Lord" (Dave Brubeck) – 6:21
"Mr. Fats" (Dave Brubeck) – 3:12
"Tritonis" (Dave Brubeck) – 8:05

Personnel
Dave Brubeck – piano
Jerry Bergonzi – tenor saxophone, clarinet, electric bass guitar
Chris Brubeck – electric bass guitar, bass trombone
Randy Jones – drums

References

1980 albums
Dave Brubeck albums
Concord Records albums